Edelény Subregion Borsod-Abaúj-Zemplén sixth largest of the subregions of Hungary. Area : 783,21 km². Population : 36 155 (2009)

Settlements:
 Abod
 Balajt
 Becskeháza
 Bódvalenke
 Bódvarákó
 Bódvaszilas
 Boldva
 Borsodszirák
 Damak
 Debréte
 Edelény
 Égerszög
 Galvács
 Hangács
 Hegymeg
 Hidvégardó
 Irota
 Jósvafő
 Komjáti
 Ládbesenyő
 Lak
 Martonyi
 Meszes
 Nyomár
 Perkupa
 Rakaca
 Rakacaszend
 Szakácsi
 Szalonna
 Szendrő
 Szendrőlád
 Szin
 Szinpetri
 Szögliget
 Szőlősardó
 Szuhogy
 Teresztenye
 Tomor
 Tornabarakony
 Tornakápolna
 Tornanádaska
 Tornaszentandrás
 Tornaszentjakab
 Varbóc
 Viszló
 Ziliz

See also
Edelény District (from 2013)

References

Subregions of Hungary